Gol Tappeh-ye Sofla (also Romanized as Gol Tappeh-ye Soflá; also known as Gol Tappeh) is a village in Qaratureh Rural District, in the Central District of Divandarreh County, Kurdistan Province, Iran. At the 2006 census, its population was 557, in 102 families. The village is populated by Kurds.

References 

Towns and villages in Divandarreh County
Kurdish settlements in Kurdistan Province